Bagac, officially the Municipality of Bagac, is a 3rd class municipality in the province of Bataan, Philippines. According to the 2020 census, it has a population of 31,365 people.

Geography

According to the Philippine Statistics Authority, the municipality has a land area of  constituting  of the  total area of Bataan.

Bagac borders Balanga (the provincial capital) to the north, Orion and
Limay to the east, Mariveles to the south, and Morong and the South China Sea to the west.

Climate

Bagac has a tropical monsoon climate (Am) with little to no rainfall from December to April and heavy to extremely heavy rainfall from May to November.

Barangays
Bagac is politically subdivided into 14 barangays.

Demographics

In the 2020 census, Bagac had a population of 31,365.

Economy

Tourism
 Bagac Friendship Tower. — The monument, symbolizing the renewed friendship between Japan and the Philippines after the events of World War II, was erected by Risshō Kōsei Kai, a Japanese Buddhist organization. The  tower is composed of three pillars interconnected by several multi-layer rings. It located at the junction of the Gov. Linao National Road and the road to the Bagac town proper.
 Las Casas Filipinas de Acuzar. — a heritage park built by José "Gerry" Acuzar, owner of the New San Jose Builders and history art collector. Inside this heritage park is a collection of Spanish Colonial buildings and stone houses (bahay na bato in Tagalog), planned to resemble a settlement reminiscent of the period. These houses were carefully transplanted from different parts of the Philippines and rehabilitated to their former splendor.
 Montemar Beach Club. — The Montemar Beach Club, Inc. (“MBC” or the “Club”) was incorporated as a non-stock, non-profit corporation in 1978 and has since been operating as a private membership beach resort Club.  The Club has approximately 350 active members among its 8000 proprietary shareholders, and is open to members, their guests and sponsored groups.  As a beach resort, MBC is ideal for rest, recreation, dining, conventions, parties and weddings.  Montemar Beach Club, Inc. is majority-owned by Philippine Communications Satellite Corporation (Philcomsat).

Popular culture
 The Ciudad Real de Acuzar Heritage Park was the location of the TV Show Zorro of GMA Network.

Gallery

References

External links

[ Philippine Standard Geographic Code]

Municipalities of Bataan